Harry Conway (born 17 September 1992) is an Australian cricketer. He made his first-class debut for New South Wales on 5 March 2016 in the 2015–16 Sheffield Shield. He made his List A debut in the final of the 2016–17 Matador BBQs One-Day Cup on 23 October 2016.

Ahead of the 2022–23 cricket season in Australia, Conway was signed by South Australia.

References

External links
 

1992 births
Living people
Australian cricketers
New South Wales cricketers
Adelaide Strikers cricketers
Cricketers from Sydney